Patrick Leonard (born 1956) is an American musician.

Patrick Leonard may also refer to:
Patrick Leonard (baseball) (born 1992), American baseball player
Patrick Leonard (footballer) (1877–?), Scottish professional footballer
Patrick Leonard (politician), Irish politician, businessman and landowner
Patrick James Leonard (1847–1899), Medal of Honor recipient
Patrick Thomas Leonard (1828–1905), Medal of Honor recipient